The Murphy USA El Dorado Shootout is a tournament on the Epson Tour, the LPGA's developmental tour. It has been a part of the tour's schedule since 2015. It is held at Mystic Creek Golf Club in El Dorado, Arkansas.

Winners

References

External links

Coverage on Epson Tour website

Symetra Tour events
Golf in Arkansas
El Dorado, Arkansas
Recurring sporting events established in 2015
2015 establishments in Arkansas